The Woman Hunter is a 1972 American made-for-television mystery film that premiered as the CBS Movie of the Week on September 19, 1972. The teleplay was written by Brian Clemens and Tony Williamson (the former's first and the latter's only American TV work), from a story by Clemens about a socialite's involvement with an international thief.

The film, directed by Bernard L. Kowalski and starring Barbara Eden, Stuart Whitman and Robert Vaughn, was shot in Acapulco, Mexico and produced by Bing Crosby Productions. Larry Storch and his wife Norma appear at the beginning of the film.

Plot
Dina Hunter (Barbara Eden), wealthy and unstable, takes a Mexican holiday with her husband Jerry (Robert Vaughn) in order for her to recover from a traffic accident. An artist named Paul Carter (Stuart Whitman) becomes intrigued by Dina and wants to paint her portrait. Dina's interest in him leads her to uncover clues that he is more than just an artist — she discovers that he may possibly be a jewel thief and murderer. She tries to convince her husband and the local authorities but no one will believe her story.

Cast
Barbara Eden as Dina Hunter
Robert Vaughn as Jerry Hunter
Stuart Whitman as Paul Carter
Sydney Chaplin as George
Enrique Lucero as Commissioner Vardy

References

External links

1972 television films
1972 films
1970s mystery films
American mystery films
CBS network films
1970s English-language films
Films set in Mexico
Films shot in Mexico
Films directed by Bernard L. Kowalski
Films scored by George Duning
1970s American films